Bostaneh (also Romanized as Bostāneh and Bastaneh; also known as Bandar-e Bostāneh, Bandar-e Bostāneh, Bostānū, and Būstāneh) is a village in Moghuyeh Rural District, in the Central District of Bandar Lengeh County, Hormozgan Province, Iran. At the 2006 census, its population was 2,464, in 452 families.

References 

Populated places in Bandar Lengeh County